MFC Stalitsa Minsk is a Belarusan futsal club from Minsk, that plays in the Belarus national futsal championships, founded in 2013. Three-time champions of Belarus (2013/14, 2016/17, 2018/19) and Belarusan cup winner (2014/15).

Honours

Domestic

League
 Belarusian Premier League
 Winners (3): 2013/14, 2016/17, 2018/19

Cup
 Belarusian Cup
 Winners (1): 2014/15

References

External links
 Official website
 Club profile on the UEFA official website

Futsal clubs in Belarus
Futsal clubs established in 2013
2013 establishments in Belarus